The Thomas Cobbold established a brewing business East Anglia in 1723. It remained a family business of the Cobbold family until 1957, when they merged the business with that of the Tollemache family, creating Tolly Cobbold. The brand came to dominate the hospitality industry in Ipswich where traces of their name can still be found on a number of buildings.

Frank Woolnough, formerly the curator of Ipswich Museum, recognised the historic interest of the Cobbold "Inns and Taverns" remarking he preferred such words to the term "public house" which he regarded as more recent and common. He wrote the Souvenir of the bi-centenary of the Cliff Brewery 1723–1923 published in 1923 under the name Felix Walton. This contained "A Selection of Ancient and Historical Inns attached to the Cliff Brewery".

Before Tolly Cobbold were taken over by Ellerman Lines in 1977, the company owned a large number of public houses across East Anglia.

References

Cobbold pubs